The Palmer station is a railway station in Greater Victoria, British Columbia. It served as a flag stop on Via Rail's Dayliner service, which has been indefinitely suspended since 2011.

References 

Via Rail stations in British Columbia
Disused railway stations in Canada